As the crow flies is an idiom for the shortest distance between two points.

As the Crow Flies may also refer to:
 As the Crow Flies (album), by The Advisory Circle
 "As the Crow Flies" (comics), a Batman story arc
 As the Crow Flies (novel), by Jeffrey Archer
 As the Crow Flies (play), by David Henry Hwang
 As the Crow Flies, a children's book by Elizabeth Winthrop
 As the Crow Flies, a webcomic by Melanie Gillman
 As the Crow Flies, an orbital launch by Rocket Lab

See also
 Three Days as the Crow Flies, a novel by Danny Simmons